Jana Kapustová (born 11 August 1983 in Žilina, Czechoslovakia) is a Slovakian ice hockey forward and  defender.

International career
Kapustová was selected for the Slovakia national women's ice hockey team in the 2010 Winter Olympics. She played in all five games, scoring one goal, and tying for the team lead with three points. She played in the qualifying campaigns for the 2010 and 2014 Olympics.

Kapustová has also appeared for Slovakia at nine IIHF Women's World Championships, across three levels. Her first appearance came in 2003. She appeared at the top level championships in 2011 and 2012.

Career statistics

International career

References

External links
Eurohockey.com Profile

1983 births
Living people
Ice hockey players at the 2010 Winter Olympics
Olympic ice hockey players of Slovakia
Sportspeople from Žilina
Slovak women's ice hockey forwards
HC Tornado players
Slovak expatriate ice hockey players in Russia